Wojciech Kostrzewa (born October 18, 1960) is a Polish manager and entrepreneur, CEO of Billon Group and president of the Polish Business Roundtable (Polska Rada Biznesu), an organization of owners and key managers of the largest Polish companies and international enterprises operating in Poland.

Education and academic activity 
Wojciech Kostrzewa graduated from the Faculty of Economics at the University of Kiel in 1987. He also studied law at the University of Warsaw in 1979–1981. In 1981, together with four other students from Austria, Hungary, and West Germany, he founded the European Law Students' Association (ELSA). In 1984–1991, he worked as a graduate assistant at the University of Kiel and later became a researcher at the Kiel Institute for the World Economy. He published several academic papers on economics and finance.

Professional career 
In 1989–1991, Wojciech Kostrzewa served as an economic advisor to the Polish Finance Minister, Leszek Balcerowicz. In 1990–1995, he was CEO of the Polish Development Bank (Polski Bank Rozwoju). In 1996, he became deputy CEO, and in 1998 President and CEO of BRE Bank (today's mBank), where he worked until 2004. In 2002–2004, he was also regional director of Commerzbank, responsible for its operations in Central and Eastern Europe. At that time, he was reported to be the only Pole who occupied a high managerial position at a foreign private bank. In 2005–2018, he was President and CEO of ITI Group and long-term chairman of the supervisory board of TVN, one of the biggest Polish private TV broadcasters in the period of his presidency. He was also co-founder and co-owner of Quedex Bitcoin Derivatives Exchange licensed by the Gibraltar Financial Services Commission (GFSC). 

In 2018, he became CEO of the Polish-British fintech company Billon, a FCA and PFSA registered e-money institution, which develops a technology to store and transfer regulated currencies and other data based on a proprietary blockchain. Currently, Wojciech Kostrzewa is also member of the board of directors of the Swiss railway rolling stock manufacturer Stadler Rail (since 2012), member of supervisory boards of the Ergo Hestia insurance group's companies (since 2017), owner and chairman of the Pascal Publishing House. In 2020, he became member of the supervisory board of the Polish branch of Canal+.

In 2004–2007, he was president of the German-Polish Chamber of Commerce and Industry. In 2007–2020, he served as vice president of the Polish Confederation Lewiatan (Konfederacja Lewiatan), a Polish nationwide employers' organization, where he currently serves as member of the General Council. In 2015, he was elected vice president, and in 2019 president of the Polish Business Roundtable (Polska Rada Biznesu), organization of owners and CEOs of largest companies in Poland. In 2021, he was re-elected to serve his second term.

Honors 

 Order of Polonia Restituta (2015)

References 

1960 births
Polish chief executives
University of Kiel alumni
Living people
Polish bankers
University of Warsaw alumni
Polish businesspeople
Recipients of the Order of Polonia Restituta
Polish television people
Television executives